is a former Japanese model, adult video (AV) actress, and a movie and TV actress from the 1990s. After retiring from performing, she went on to a second career as a movie screenwriter under the name Yukie Ochiai (落合雪恵).

Life and career

AV career
Hitomi Shiraishi was born on December 25, 1971. She made her debut as an AV actress at the age of eighteen in September 1990 with Virgin Ecstasy: Sensual Princess Hitomi Shiraishi released by the h.m.p. Tiffany label. Shiraishi appeared in several more videos for h.m.p. but also worked with other studios including Cosmos Plan, Shy Plan and Alice Japan. In her December 1991 video for Alice Japan, Wait Until Dark, the three scenes have her being treated as a sex slave, having a session with a vampire, and having sex with her husband. May 1992 saw her in the second installment in Kuki's series Sister-in-law's Warm Underwear engaging in a "sweet and tender forbidden love story". Also in May 1992, she starred in the inaugural video for the MAX-A Samansa label Witch-Wife Hitomi Shiraishi.

Shiraishi left the AV field for a while but after an absence of two years, she returned with the August 1995 video from Shy Plan, Heisei Goddess Legend: Resurrection. Her final retirement video Break was released by Shy Plan in November 1995. A few months later in February 1996, Shy Plan issued Legend of Hitomi Shiraishi, a compilation video covering her career with the studio.

In 2001, FantaDream released two "uncensored" videos starring Shiraishi (Uncensored videos lack the mosaic pixelation masking the genitals which is mandatory in videos released in Japan). The first video, released in September, was the initial volume in FantaDream's Super Idol series; the second from December, titled Hitomi Shiraishi Returns, was Volume 9 in the Super Idol series.

Despite her having been retired from AV work for more than 15 years, when the major Japanese adult video distributor DMM held a poll of its customers in 2012 to select the 100 all-time best AV actresses to celebrate the 30th anniversary of adult videos in Japan, Shiraishi made the list, placing at number 63. Also in 2012, the Taiwan online news service NowNews named Shiraishi as one of their Top Ten Japanese AV Idols.

V-Cinema and films
Shiraishi also appeared in a number of softcore V-Cinema productions and some mainstream films. She had a role in the April 1996 film Lady Ninja: Reflections of Darkness, a female ninja (kunoichi) costume drama, and a month later appeared in the Rashomon drama In a Thicket directed by pink film director Hisayasu Satō known as one of the "Four Heavenly Kings of Pink". V-Cinema films include Tokyo Decameron which was released in Japan in July 1996 and in an English subtitled version by Asian Pulp Cinema in November 2001, and the erotic bondage thriller The Bondage Master which was issued in Japan in April 1996 and in an English subtitled version from Asian Pulp Cinema in 2000.

TV appearances
From late 1994 to early 1998, Shiraishi had roles in several Japanese TV dramas including shows for the Osaka-based networks KTV, ABC and MBS as well as TBS and NTV in Tokyo. One of these was the January 2, 1996 TBS production , based on the novel , featuring the fictional detective Kosuke Kindaichi. She also appeared in Part 3 of the Fuji TV series  broadcast January 5, 1998 and featuring Ken Ogata, Kaoru Kobayashi, Masahiro Nakai and Hikari Ishida.

Screenwriter
After her retirement from performing Shiraishi became associated with the avant-garde music studio Kaerucafe (カエルカフェ) and when the company expanded into film production, she embarked on a new career as a screenwriter under her real name . Since 2003 she has written a number of screenplays for films produced by Kaerucafe and directed by Masatoshi Akihara and has also been responsible for editing and art work in some of the productions. Her screenplay for the 2008 film The Story of Ito is a modern version of the fantasy story Ito Norisuke no Hanashi by Yakumo Koizumi (Lafcadio Hearn) while her 2009 The Setting Sun starring Eriko Sato is based on the novel of the same name by Osamu Dazai.

Selected filmography
{| cellpadding=2 style="width:100%; text-align:left; border-width:0px; border-collapse:collapse; background:#eee;"
|-
! Video title !! Release date !! Studio !! Director !! Notes
|-
| colspan=6 style=background-color:#ddf; |
|-
| colspan=6 style=background-color:#ddf; |

Adult videos (AV)
|- style=background:#fff;
| Virgin Ecstasy: Sensual Princess Hitomi Shiraishi
| 1990-09-15
| h.m.p. TiffanyPTF-008
| Yukihiko Shimamura
| Debut
|- style=background:#f7f7f7;
| New Sensual Princess
| 1991-05-12
| h.m.p. TiffanyATF-014
| Yukihiko Shimamura
| 
|- style=background:#fff;
| Super Porno '91 Onedari Princess
| 1991-06-23
| h.m.p. TiffanyATF-018
| Yukihiko Shimamura
| 
|- style=background:#f7f7f7;
| Hardcore Extract Uzuki Princess
| 1991-07-06
| h.m.p. TiffanyATF-019
| Yukihiko Shimamura
| 
|- style=background:#fff;
| Lucky Hole
| 1991-08-25
| Cosmos PlanIS-52
| 
| 
|- style=background:#f7f7f7;
| OL Bijyū - The Office Vibration
| 1991-09-14
| HRC CherHRC-092
| 
| 
|- style=background:#fff;
| Hug Me Silently
| 1991-09-27
| Alice JapanKA-1422
| Akira Ishizaki
| 
|- style=background:#f7f7f7;
| Pink Skin
| 1991-09-29
| Cosmos PlanIS-54
| 
| 
|- style=background:#fff;
| Pacifier Angel
| 1991-11-10
| h.m.p. TiffanyATF-033
| 
| 
|- style=background:#f7f7f7;
| Venus Bunny 4
| 1991-11-29
| Shy PlanFE-040
| Kunihiro Hasegawa
| 
|- style=background:#fff;
| Suki? Suki? Kiss Me, Please!
| 1991-12-15
| Cosmos PlanIS-60
| 
| 
|- style=background:#f7f7f7;
| Wait Till Dark
| 1991-12-27
| Alice JapanKA-1442
| Shuji Onizawa
| 
|- style=background:#fff;
| Perverted Secretary Likes It Raw - Part 8H Hisho wa Nama Gao Suki PART8
| 1992-01-07
| HRC CherHRC-106
| Kunihiro Hasegawa
| 
|- style=background:#f7f7f7;
| Targeted Female Teacher 2
| 1992-01-24
| Shy PlanFE-044
| You Camon
| 
|- style=background:#fff;
| I Wanna Lick Your Balls & Chains Vol.7
| 1992-02-29
| Royal Art StellaSTV-1079
| Shuji Onizawa
| 
|- style=background:#f7f7f7;
| Hitomi's Obscene Bible
| 1992-03-06
| HRC CherHRC-114
| Kunihiro Hasegawa
| 
|- style=background:#fff;
| Fetish Video Magazine: Shukujokan
| 1992-03-08
| Cosmos PlanM-34
| 
| With Mariko Kishi & Nao Suzuki
|- style=background:#f7f7f7;
| Kankin Lingerie Queen 2
| 1992
| Shy PlanFE-050
| 
| 
|- style=background:#fff;
| Indecent Uniform: NugaseteSeifuku Waisetsu nee, Nugasete
| 1992-04-17
| Athena EizouAS-241
| Hikaru Kitoh
| 
|- style=background:#f7f7f7;
| Sister-in-law's Warm Underwear
| 1992-05-16 (VHS)1997-09-26 (VCD)1999-02-26 (DVD)
| Kuki SoniaQX-227 (VHS)VKD-015 (VCD)KDV-046 (DVD)
| Jin Yuho
| 
|- style=background:#fff;
| Witch-Wife Hitomi Shiraishi
| 1992-05-30
| MAX-A SamansaXS-2001
| Kunihiro Hasegawa
| 
|- style=background:#f7f7f7;
| The Moment of TruthShinjitsu no Shunkan
| 1992-06-13
| Shy PlanFE-057
| Kunihiro Hasegawa
| 
|- style=background:#fff;
| Wedding Slave 2
| 1992-06-29
| HRC CherHRC-124
| 
| 
|- style=background:#f7f7f7;
| Flash Paradise
| 1992-07-03
| Alice JapanKA-1481
| Rokurō Mochizuki
| 
|- style=background:#fff;
| Sexy ButtMejiri
| 1992-08-07
| Alice JapanKA-1489
| Kunihiro Hasegawa
| 
|- style=background:#f7f7f7;
| White Paper on Wanton Wife
| 1992-09-11
| Athena EizouAS-262
| Hikaru Kitoh
| 
|- style=background:#fff;
| Ecstasy Feeling
| 1992-08-31
| Royal Art/Deluxe ParisDP-042
| Mondo Suzuki
| 
|- style=background:#f7f7f7;
| Venus Bunny Special
| 1995-03-17
| Shy PlanFE-178
| 
| Compilation with Mari Asaka, Reika, Reina Hosokawa, Shiori Fujitani & Yumika Sugimoto
|- style=background:#fff;
| Heisei Goddess Legend: Resurrection
| 1995-08-31
| Shy PlanFE-204
| Kunihiro Hasegawa
| 
|- style=background:#f7f7f7;
| Declaration of Well-Bred Woman
| 1995-09-27
| Shy PlanFE-208
| Kunihiro Hasegawa
| 
|- style=background:#fff;
| Kankin Lingerie Queen History
| 1995-10-21
| Shy PlanFE-212
| You Camon
| With Yuri Saeki & Mariya Kurasawa
|- style=background:#f7f7f7;
| Targeted Female Teacher 10
| 1995-10-31
| Shy PlanFE-214
| Kunihiro Hasegawa
| 
|- style=background:#fff;
| Break
| 1995-11-30
| Shy PlanFE-219
| Kunihiro Hasegawa
| 
|- style=background:#f7f7f7;
| Legend of Hitomi Shiraishi
| 1996-02-19
| Shy PlanFE-234
| Kunihiro Hasegawa
| Compilation of scenes from her earlier work for Shy Plan
|- style=background:#fff;
| Pero Pero Pink 2
| 1997-06-20
| Alice JapanDV-002
| 
| Compilation DVD with Miho Aimoto
|- style=background:#f7f7f7;
| Super Idol Vol. 1: Hitomi Shiraishi
| 2001-09-20
| FantaDreamFDD-1201
| 
| Uncensored
|- style=background:#fff;
| Super Idol Vol. 9: Hitomi Shiraishi Returns
| 2001-12-15
| FantaDreamFDD-1209
| 
| Uncensored
|- style=background:#f7f7f7;
| Cosmos Classic Hitomi Shiraishi
| 2002-09-13
| Cosmos PlanMDM-021
| 
| Compilation DVD containing Lucky Hole and Pink Skin
|- style=background:#fff;
| Legend Resurrected: Legend Special Vol. 5
| 2008-12-19
| GraffitiGRAS-005
| 
| Compilation DVD containing Venus Bunny 4, Targeted Female Teacher 2, The Moment of Truth and Heisei Goddess Legend: Resurrection
|- style=background:#f7f7f7;
| Legend Resurrected: Legend Special Vol. 10
| 2009-02-27
| GraffitiGRAS-010
| 
| Compilation DVD containing Declaration of Well-Bred Woman, Targeted Female Teacher 10, Break and Legend of Hitomi Shiraishi
|}

Photobooks
 Eyes (アイズ) - Eichi Publishing (April 1992)
 Love for Sale'' – TIS (July 1992)

Notes

Sources

As Hitomi Shiraishi

As Yukie Ochiai

External links
 
 X CITY AVアイドル名鑑 白石ひとみ

21st-century Japanese women writers
Actresses from Tokyo
Japanese screenwriters
Pink film actors
Japanese female adult models
Japanese pornographic film actresses
1971 births
Living people
21st-century screenwriters